Getulio Alviani (5 September 1939 in Udine – 24 February 2018 in Milan) was an Italian painter based in Milan. He is considered to be an important International Optical - kinetic artist.

Life and work

Alviani was born in Udine, where he showed talent for design and geometric drawing from his childhood. He enrolled in the Venice Art School, but soon showed little interest in his studies, spending afternoons in Venice's museums in contemplation of classical masterpieces. He also started doing small jobs for local architects, and helped local artists in inking projects such as etchings.

His first series was "The Wires", inspired by aerial electric wires. Fascinated by some polished aluminium surfaces found in a factory in which he was working: after further polishing and abrasion, he created his landmark "Superfici a testura vibratile" (vibrating texture surfaces), winning international acclaim. In 1961 he was invited to the Zagreb exhibition "Nove Tendencije", together with other artists working along similar lines and exploring the opportunities of a dynamic art which interacts with the viewer. He started exchanging ideas with artists like Julio Le Parc, François Morellet and Enrico Castellani, actively participating in the activities of the so-called G.R.A.V. (Groupe de Recherche d'Art Visuelle) in Paris.

In 1962 he moved to Milan, where he became friends with Piero Manzoni and Lucio Fontana, who was very interested in his works and bought some of his "surfaces". He also worked with other famous artists like Max Bill, Bruno Munari and Josef Albers. In 1964 he was invited to show at the Venice Biennale, successfully sharing a room with Enrico Castellani.

In 1965 Alviani took part in The Responsive Eye at MoMA in New York, together with other artists associated with Kinetic and Programmed Art. His work was purchased by MoMA and used as a poster image for the museum's next exhibition, "The New Acquisitions". In 1968 he was invited at Kassel's Documenta 4.

Throughout the 1970s he travelled to South America, and accepted, upon request of Jesús Rafael Soto, the directorship of the Jesús Soto Museum of Modern Art, Ciudad Bolívar, Venezuela. His work was again included in the Venice Biennale in 1984, 1986 and 1993. He also exhibited at the Milan Triennale, the Kunsthaus Graz, Palazzo delle Papesse in Siena, Academie de France in Rome, the Buenos Aires Biennale, the travelling exhibition "Light, Movement and Programming", and the Rome Quadriennale.

Alviani's works are actively traded in Italian and international modern art auctions, such as the "Italian sales" held in London by Christie's and Sotheby's. Among his works, the most appreciated by the market are the "Superfici a testura variabile" where the polished aluminium reflects the light in different hues according to the angle at which they are viewed. Other works by Alviani are the "chromodynamic surfaces", where primary colour interactions are studied, and his "mirrors" with their illusion of rings created on reflecting metal surfaces.

Alviani was the author of a book on Josef Albers (1988). He also edited with Giancarlo Pauletto a book on Michel Seuphor (1987), and contributed with his photographs to a book of  Pauletto and Margaret A. Miller on Richard Anuszkiewicz (1988).

Publications 
Getulio Alviani, Giancarlo Pauletto, Michel Seuphor, Concordia Sette, Pordenone, 1987
Giancarlo Pauletto, Margaret A. Miller, Richard Anuszkiewicz: Opere 1961-1987, photographs by Getulio Alviani, Centro Iniziative Culturali, Pordenone, 1988
Getulio Alviani, Josef Albers, L'arca edizioni, Pordenone, 1988,

Literature
William C. Seitz, The Responsive Eye, Museum of Modern Art, New York, 1965
Maurizio Fagiolo dell'Arco, L'iperluce di Alviani, Bulzoni, Rome, 1964
Umbro Apollonio, Getulio Alviani, Parco Massari, Ferrara, 1980
Renato Barilli, L'arte Contemporanea, da Cèzanne alle ultime tendenze, Feltrinelli, Milan, 1984
Adachiara Zevi,  Peripezie del dopoguerra nell'arte Italiana, Einaudi, Turin, 2005
Renato Barilli, Storia dell'arte contemporanea in Italia, Bollati Boringhieri, Turin, 2007
Rachele Ferrario, Luigi Settembrini, Room with a View, Museo Palazzo Reale, Milan, 2007

See also

Abstract Art
Kinetic Art
Op Art

References

Sources

 This article draws from the corresponding article in the Italian Wikipedia.

1939 births
2018 deaths
20th-century Italian painters
Italian male painters
21st-century Italian painters
Italian contemporary artists
People from Udine
Op art
Olivetti people